Wimbish is a surname, locational for someone from Wimbish. Notable people with the surname include:

C. Bette Wimbish (1924–2009), African-American activist
Doug Wimbish (born 1956), American bass player

References

English toponymic surnames